DIGITALEUROPE is the European organisation that represents the digital technology industry whose members include 98 major technology companies and 41 national trade associations. It seeks to ensure industry participation in the development and implementation of EU policies" and has several working groups that focus on different aspects of policy—environment, trade, technical and regulatory and the digital economy. Based in Brussels, Belgium, DIGITALEUROPE represents over 10,000 companies with a combined annual revenue of over €3 trillion.

History 
DIGITALEUROPE was formed in 1999 as the European Information and Communications Technology Industry Association (EICTA) by consolidating two former European organisations, ECTEL and EUROBIT, which represented the information and telecommunications industries. EICTA expanded its scope to include the consumer electronics industry; on October 1, 2001, the association merged with the European Association of Consumer Electronics Manufacturers (EACEM). The new joint association changed its name to the European Information, Communications and Consumer Electronics Technology Industry Association (but kept its original acronym, EICTA).

On March 12, 2009, EICTA rebranded as DIGITALEUROPE to better reflect the importance of the consumer electronics sector in Europe and its slogan "Building Digital Europe".

On September 5, 2014, DIGITALEUROPE released an Ultra HD logo to certify companies that meet their technical requirements. The technical requirements for the Ultra HD logo is that the display must have a resolution of at least 3840×2160, a video signal path that does not reduce the resolution, a minimum color space of Rec. 709, and HDMI input that supports HDCP 2.2 content protection.

In November 2014, it published a paper called "Law Enforcement Access to Data in the European Cloud" that asks the European Commission to "consider filing an amicus brief" with a U.S. appellate court regarding Microsoft's legal challenge of a U.S. warrant for a Microsoft user's private emails. As DIGITALEUROPE sees it, the fact that the data requested is stored on servers located in Dublin, Ireland, means that U.S. authorities should use mutual legal assistance treaties rather than strong-arming a U.S. multinational, which raises concerns about national sovereignty.

Corporate members 

Airbus
AMD
Amazon
Apple
Arçelik
Bidao
Bosch
Bose
Bristol-Myers Squibb
Brother
Canon
Cisco
Datev 
Dell
Dropbox
Epson
Ericsson
ESET
Facebook
Fujitsu
Google
HP
Hitachi
HP
HSBC
Huawei
Intel
Johnson & Johnson
JVCKenwood
Konica Minolta
Kyocera
Lenovo
Lexmark
LG Electronics
Loewe
Microsoft
Mastercard
Metro
MSD
Mitsubishi Electric Europe
Motorola Solutions
NEC
Nokia
Nvidia
Océ
OKI
Oracle
Palo Alto
Panasonic Europe
Philips
Pioneer
Qualcomm
Ricoh
Rockwell Automation
Samsung
SAP
SAS
Schneider Electric
Sharp
Siemens
Siemens Healthineers
Sony
Swatch Group
Tata Consultancy Services
Technicolor
Texas Instruments
Toshiba
TP Vision
Visa
VMWare
Xerox.

National trade associations 

Austria: Internet Offensive Österreich
Belarus: INFOPARK
Belgium: AGORIA
Bulgaria: BAIT 
Croatia: Croatian Chamber of Economy 
Cyprus: CITEA 
Denmark: DI Digital, IT-BRANCHEN 
Estonia: ITL 
Finland: FFTI 
France: Tech in France, AFNUM, Force Numérique 
Germany: BITKOM, ZVEI 
Greece: SEPE 
Hungary: IVSZ
Ireland: ICT IRELAND 
Italy: ANITEC-ASSINFORM 

Lithuania: INFOBALT 
Luxembourg: APSI 
Norway: Abelia 
Netherlands: Nederlands ICT, FIAR 
Poland: KIGEIT, PIIT, ZIPSEE
Portugal: AGEFE 
Romania: APDETIC, ANIS 
Slovakia: ITAS 
Slovenia: GZS 
Spain: AMETIC
Sweden: Föreningen Teknikföretagen i Sverige, IT&Telekomföretagen
Switzerland: SWICO
Turkey: Digital Turkey Platform, ECID 
Ukraine: IT UKRAINE
United Kingdom: TechUK

Digital Agenda 

In anticipation to the publication of Neelie Kroes's Digital Agenda, DigitalEurope released a paper in May 2010 about Europe's digital future which was called A Transformational Agenda for the Digital Age DigitalEurope's Vision 2020.

References

External links 

 
 Download the DigitalEurope Corporate brochure_Our Work - June 2016

Information technology organizations based in Europe
Information technology lobbying organizations
Lobbying organizations in Europe
Pan-European trade and professional organizations
Organisations based in Brussels
Organizations established in 1999
1999 establishments in the European Union